Route 233 is a provincial highway located in the Estrie and Montérégie regions of Quebec east of Montreal. The highway links Farnham and Saint-Césaire with Saint-Hyacinther. It starts at a junction with Route 104 between Farnham and Sainte-Brigide-d'Iberville, next to a training facility of the Canadian Forces and runs north toward a parclo interchange with Autoroute 10 after which it crosses the Rivière du Sud-Ouest which it follows for a few kilometers until its headwaters on Yamaska River. Shortly after it runs through Saint-Césaire, crossing Route 112, before continuing to follow the Yamaska until its end at the junction of Route 231.

Municipalities along Route 233
 Farnham
 Sainte-Brigide-d'Iberville
 Saint-Césaire
 Saint-Damase
 Saint-Hyacinthe

See also
 List of Quebec provincial highways

References

External links 
 Official Transports Quebec Provincial Road Network Map 
 233 on GoogleMaps

233